Juan José Barros Araujo (born 24 June 1989 in Barranquilla, Colombia) is a Peruvian footballer.

Club career
At the club level, Barros played for Coronel Bolognesi from 2006–2009. He helped Bolognesi win the 2007 Torneo Clausura.

International career
He also played six games for the Peru national under-20 football team and scored two goals.

References

1989 births
Living people
Footballers from Barranquilla
Colombian footballers
Colombian expatriate footballers
Peruvian footballers
Peru under-20 international footballers
Peruvian expatriate footballers
Association football midfielders
Deportivo Cali footballers
Centro Iqueño footballers
Academia Deportiva Cantolao players
Circolo Sportivo Italiano footballers
Coronel Bolognesi footballers
Sporting Cristal footballers
Club Universitario de Deportes footballers
TSV 1860 Munich players
FBC Melgar footballers
Cobreloa footballers
Unión Comercio footballers
Chilean Primera División players
2. Bundesliga players
Peruvian Primera División players
Expatriate footballers in Chile
Expatriate footballers in Colombia
Expatriate footballers in Peru
Expatriate footballers in Germany
Colombian emigrants to Peru